Khanpar is a village located in the Morbi district in the Indian state of Gujarat.

References

Villages in Morbi district